Robert Lee Kroll (born June 9, 1950) is a former American football cornerback in the National Football League (NFL) who played for the Green Bay Packers.  Kroll played college football at Northern Michigan University and played professionally for one season, in 1972.

While playing football at Northern Michigan University in 1971, Kroll tied the NCAA single season Division 1 interception record of 13  and was named an All-American. He now resides in Florida.

References

1950 births
Living people
Sportspeople from Green Bay, Wisconsin
Players of American football from Wisconsin
American football defensive backs
Northern Michigan Wildcats football players
Green Bay Packers players